This is a list of rural localities in Irkutsk Oblast. Irkutsk Oblast (Irkutskaya oblast) is a federal subject of Russia (an oblast), located in southeastern Siberia in the basins of the Angara, Lena, and Nizhnyaya Tunguska Rivers. The administrative center is the city of Irkutsk. Population: 2,428,750 (2010 Census).

Alarsky District 
Rural localities in Alarsky District:

 Kutulik

Balagansky District 
Rural localities in Balagansky District:

 Kumareyka

Bayandayevsky District 
Rural localities in Bayandayevsky District:

 Bayanday

Bodaybinsky District 
Rural localities in Bodaybinsky District:

 Aprelsk
 Perevoz

Bokhansky District 
Rural localities in Bokhansky District:

 Bokhan

Bratsky District 
Rural localities in Bratsky District:

 Kezhemsky

Chunsky District 
Rural localities in Chunsky District:

 Nevanka

Ekhirit-Bulagatsky District 
Rural localities in Ekhirit-Bulagatsky District:

 Ust-Ordynsky

Irkutsky District 
Rural localities in Irkutsky District:

 Dobrolet
 Mamony
 Urik

Kachugsky District 
Rural localities in Kachugsky District:

 Biryulka
 Bolshiye Goly

Katangsky District 
Rural localities in Katangsky District:

 Yerbogachen

Kazachinsko-Lensky District 
Rural localities in Kazachinsko-Lensky District:

 Kazachinskoye

Kirensky District 
Rural localities in Kirensky District:

 Ichera

Listvyanka urban locality 
Rural localities in Listvyanka urban locality:

 Bolshiye Koty

Nizhneudinsky District 
Rural localities in Nizhneudinsky District:

 Abalakovo

Nukutsky District 
Rural localities in Nukutsky District:

 Novonukutsky

Olkhonsky District 
Rural localities in Olkhonsky District:

 Peschanaya
 Khuzhir
 Kharantsy
 Sakhyurta
 Uzury
 Yelantsy

Osinsky District 
Rural localities in Osinsky District:

 Abramovka
 Osa

Slyudyansky District 
Rural localities in Slyudyansky District:

 Baykal

Tulunsky District 
Rural localities in Tulunsky District:

 1st Otdelenie Gosudarstvennoy Selektsionnoy Stantsii
 4th Otdelenie Gosudarstvennoy Selektsionnoy Stantsii

Usolsky District, Irkutsk Oblast 
Rural localities in Usolsky District, Irkutsk Oblast:

 Baday

Ust-Udinsky District 
Rural localities in Ust-Udinsky District:

 Novaya Uda

See also
 
 Lists of rural localities in Russia

References

Irkutsk Oblast